Incan is of or pertaining to the Incas, their culture or empire, the Inca Empire.

Incan may also refer to:

 of or pertaining to Inca, Spain
 Incan berries (also called golden berries), popular with some vegans
 Inca people, the people of the Incan Empire
 Quechua people, the people of the Incan civilization
 Incan language, the language of the Incas

See also

 Inca (disambiguation)
 
 
 Inkan seals (stamps)
 Quechua (disambiguation)